The 2018 Dow Tennis Classic was a professional tennis tournament played on indoor hard courts. It was the twenty-fourth edition of the tournament and was part of the 2018 ITF Women's Circuit. It took place in Midland, United States, on 29 January–4 February 2018.

Singles main draw entrants

Seeds 

 1 Rankings as of 15 January 2018.

Other entrants 
The following players received a wildcard into the singles main draw:
  Madison Brengle
  Victoria Duval
  Whitney Osuigwe
  Jessica Pegula

The following players received entry from the qualifying draw:
  Ulrikke Eikeri
  Jovana Jakšić
  Ann Li
  Katherine Sebov

The following player received entry as a Lucky Loser:
  Usue Maitane Arconada

Champions

Singles

 Madison Brengle def.  Jamie Loeb, 6–1, 6–2

Doubles
 
 Kaitlyn Christian /  Sabrina Santamaria def.  Jessica Pegula /  Maria Sanchez, 7–5, 4–6, [10–8]

External links 
 Official website
 2018 Dow Tennis Classic at ITFtennis.com

2018 ITF Women's Circuit
2018 in American tennis
Tennis tournaments in the United States